Jérôme Nury (born 25 August 1972) is a member of the National Assembly of France representing the third constituency of Orne.

References

1972 births
Living people
People from Valence, Drôme
Politicians from Normandy
Deputies of the 15th National Assembly of the French Fifth Republic
The Republicans (France) politicians
Deputies of the 16th National Assembly of the French Fifth Republic
Members of Parliament for Orne